Carex proposita is a species of sedge known by the common name Great Smoky Mountain sedge. It has a scattered distribution in parts of the western United States, including Washington, Idaho, and California. It was named for the Smoky Mountains of Idaho, not the Great Smoky Mountains, where it does not occur. This sedge produces low, dense clumps of stems under 35 centimeters tall. The inflorescence is a dense or open bundle of rounded or oval brown flower spikes. The fruit is coated in a veined perigynium with a white tip.

External links
Jepson Manual Treatment
Flora of North America
Photo gallery

proposita
Plants described in 1931